Juraj Zaťovič (born 22 October 1982 in Bojnice) is a water polo player for the University of Southern California, who received the 2006 Peter J. Cutino Award as the best collegiate water polo player among Division I NCAA teams. His position is two-meter defender.

Biography
While attending Gymnazium-Nováky in Slovakia, Zaťovič played in the Slovak League. He was a member of the Slovak National Team at the 2000 Sydney Olympics. From 2002 through 2006 he attended USC: as a freshman scoring 49 goals, sophomore 57, junior 46 and senior 68, leading the team for all four seasons. As a senior, Juraj Zaťovič became the Trojans' all-time leading scorer  when he scored five goals against UC Santa Barbara. At the NCAA Men's Water Polo Championship in December 2005, his defense earned USC a third national title, and tournament co-MVP honors for Zaťovič. He was selected as the American Water Polo Coaches Association Player of the Year and a first team All-American for the third time. The past two years he was nominated for the Cutino Award, and finally received his Cutino in 2006. Zaťovič is majoring in international relations.

References
 Juraj Zaťovič: USC Team Biography
 sports-reference

1982 births
Living people
Slovak male water polo players
Water polo players at the 2000 Summer Olympics
Olympic water polo players of Slovakia
USC School of International Relations alumni
Sportspeople from Bojnice